Karla Paola Nieto Castillo (born 9 January 1995) is a Mexican professional football midfielder who currently plays for Pachuca of the Liga MX Femenil.

Club career
Prior to turning professional, Nieto played in the amateur Liga Mexicana de Fútbol Femenil with Ballenas Galeana and Leonas Morelos.

Honours and achievements

Individual
 Liga MX Femenil Team of The Season: Apertura 2017

References

External links
 
 

1995 births
Living people
Mexican women's footballers
Footballers from Mexico City
C.F. Pachuca (women) footballers
Liga MX Femenil players
Women's association football midfielders
Mexico women's international footballers
20th-century Mexican women
21st-century Mexican women
Mexican footballers